Vladyslav Olehovych Buchakchyiskyi (born 4 March 2003) is a Ukrainian professional footballer who plays as a central midfielder for Ukrainian First League club Prykarpattia Ivano-Frankivsk, on loan from Rukh Lviv.

References

External links
 
 

2003 births
Living people
Sportspeople from Zaporizhzhia Oblast
Ukrainian footballers
Association football midfielders
FC Rukh Lviv players
FC Prykarpattia Ivano-Frankivsk (1998) players
Ukrainian First League players